Universal Laboratories Building is a building in Dassel, Minnesota, United States, listed on the National Register of Historic Places.  It was listed on the National Register for its role in the production of ergot from the mid-1930s through the late 1960s.

The business was established in 1935 as Rice Laboratories, as a manufacturer of yeast for livestock feed.  Yeast was used as a feed supplement because the enzymes fermenting in the digestive tracts of hogs and poultry would break down food and help in nutrient absorption.  In 1937, the company built a new building on the north edge of town.  In that same year, the manager of the company, Lester R. Peel, started production of ergot.  Local farmers were discarding rye that was infected with sclerotia growths, because the ergot could cause deadly poisoning.  Peel, a former school teacher, understood that the ergot also had medical applications, such as controlling postpartum bleeding and treating vasoconstriction, hypertension, vascular headaches, and migraines.

Peel gave the ergot business the name Universal Laboratories.  Production initially began with ergotic rye bought from local farmers.  Universal Laboratories staff would then bring the rye through small mills that would break up the rye kernels.  They would then pick the grain from the conveyor belt and let the ergot fall into a receptacle for bagging.  The company also hired people to work from their homes in Dassel picking and bagging ergot.  Later, the process was improved by new machines that automated the process of separating the ergot from the rye.  The grain was passed through mills that would flow into gravity separators, which had spiraling chutes that would separate the light ergot kernels from the heavier rye kernels.

Peel had good timing getting into the ergot business, because supplies in the United States had been subject to disruption. Russia was the world's principal exporter of ergot until the Russian Revolution in 1917. Spain then became the top producer of ergot, but supplies were then disrupted with the Spanish Civil War in 1936. In an effort to ensure his supply of raw materials, Peel began a campaign to educate farmers on the importance of ergot. Eli Lilly and Company, one of Peel's major customers, also assisted in this effort by providing publicity. Universal Laboratories began receiving considerable amounts of ergotic rye, which was stored in a grain elevator in downtown Dassel. The company supplied the vast majority of domestically produced ergot in the United States during World War II.

Eli Lilly continued to do business with Universal Laboratories, even after World War II ended and foreign supplies became more stable.  Peel died in 1959, and the company ceased producing yeast somewhere around that time.  In the late 1960s, Eli Lilly dropped Universal Laboratories in favor of European suppliers of ergot.  The company continued business for a while longer, providing ergot to Burroughs Wellcome, but it went out of business in 1975.  The building sat empty until the late 1990s, when local citizens rehabilitated the structure.  It now houses the Dassel Area Historical Society and its museum.

Dassel History Center & Ergot Museum
The Dassel History Center & Ergot Museum, operated by the Dassel Area Historical Society, features permanent exhibits relating to area agriculture, medicine and local history.  Themes include the medical and social history of ergot, a fungus that grows on rye and related plants; a seed corn hybrid developed in the area; a historic pharmacy display; and local politician Magnus Johnson.  There are also changing exhibits of local history.

References

External links

 Dassel History Center & Ergot Museum

1937 establishments in Minnesota
Buildings and structures in Meeker County, Minnesota
Industrial buildings and structures on the National Register of Historic Places in Minnesota
Industrial buildings completed in 1937
Museums in Meeker County, Minnesota
National Register of Historic Places in Meeker County, Minnesota